Horton is an unincorporated community in Hubbard County, in the U.S. state of Minnesota.

History
The community was named for Edward H. Horton, a lumberman.

References

Unincorporated communities in Hubbard County, Minnesota
Unincorporated communities in Minnesota